Helle Johansen is a Norwegian orienteering competitor. She received a silver medal in the relay event at the 1985 World Orienteering Championships in Bendigo, together with Ragnhild Bratberg, Hilde Tellesbø and Ellen-Sofie Olsvik.

National championships
Johansen became Norwegian champion (relay event) in 1986 with her club NTHI. She was Norwegian champion in night orienteering in 1984 and 1987.

References

Year of birth missing (living people)
Living people
Norwegian orienteers
Female orienteers
Foot orienteers
World Orienteering Championships medalists